Allan Burns (1935–2021) was an American screenwriter.

Allan Burns may also refer to:
Allan Burns (surgeon) (1781–1813), Scottish surgeon

See also
Alan Burns (disambiguation)
Allen Burns (footballer) (1870–1925), Australian rules footballer